Monroe State Forest is a Massachusetts state forest forest with recreational features located in the towns of Monroe and Florida. A small portion of the borders the state of Vermont. The forest is managed by the Department of Conservation and Recreation.

History
The majority of land was once farmland. 19th-century cellar holes and stone walls can be found throughout the area. The state forest was established in 1924. Workers with the Civilian Conservation Corps were active here in the 1930s. Their contributions included the construction of the Raycroft Lookout, a stone platform offering dramatic vistas of the Deerfield River.

Natural features
The forest's rugged terrain of steep mountains and deep valleys include Spruce Mountain as well as Dunbar Brook, which drops 700 vertical feet in two miles, cascading over boulders and forming countless waterfalls, rapids and pools.

Old growth forest
Researchers have identified  of old-growth forest sites in the park. Species represented include eastern hemlock, Eastern White Pine, red spruce, and hardwoods such as yellow birch, sweet birch, American beech, American basswood, and white ash.

Activities and amenities
The forest has trails for hiking, horseback riding and cross-country skiing. Fishing and restricted hunting are permitted. Scenic views of the Hoosac Range, Green Mountains and Deerfield River can be found at the Raycroft Lookout, a stone platform reached by ascending a steep path.

References

External links 
Monroe State Forest Department of Conservation and Recreation
Monroe State Forest Map Department of Conservation and Recreation

Massachusetts state forests
Civilian Conservation Corps in Massachusetts
Parks in Franklin County, Massachusetts
Florida, Massachusetts
Protected areas established in 1924
Old-growth forests
1924 establishments in Massachusetts